Serenay Sarıkaya (born 1 July 1992) is a Turkish actress and model. She came to international attention for her roles in the shows Lale Devri, Medcezir (the Turkish remake of The O.C.), Fi, and the fantasy series Şahmaran.

She graduated from the theatre department of the Fine Arts High School in Istanbul. At the age of fourteen, she made her acting debut with a minor part in the movie Şaşkın (2006) and followed up with a part in Plajda (2008). Her first leading role was in the fantasy children's series Peri Masalı (2008). Her breakthrough role was that of Sofia in the crime comedy series Adanalı (2008–10).

With Nejat İşler, she has appeared in the films Behzat Ç. Ankara Yanıyor and İkimizin Yerine. Since 2019, Sarıkaya performs in Alice Müzikali, a musical adaption based on Alice in Wonderland. She has received critical acclaim and won numerous accolades, including two Golden Butterfly Awards.

At the age of fifteen, she participated in a beauty competition and received a special award from the jury at the European Youth Beauty Competition. Later, Sarıkaya became the first runner-up at Miss Turkey 2010. In addition to her acting career, she has appeared in various advertising films and is the face of numerous brands. In 2014, she was chosen as Woman of the Year by GQ Turkey.

Early life
Serenay Sarıkaya was born on 1 July 1992 in Ankara to Seyhan Umran and Mustafa Sarikaya. She resided with her family in Antalya until the age of seven, when her parents separated. After her father's remarriage, she moved to Istanbul with her mother. She later described her experience of growing up without her father in an interview: "For a little girl, a father is a special factor in her evolution. Growing up without your father is a big experience". At that time, while she and her mother were deciding where to live, Sarıkaya knew she wanted to become an actress and a model, which influenced their choice to settle in Istanbul. Sarıkaya studied at and graduated from the theatre department of the Fine Arts High School. She did not go on to attend university.

Sarıkaya is an avid player of volleyball and also plays basketball, as well as having an interest in tennis and Latin dance.

At the age fifteen, she participated in the European Junior Beauty Contest held in Czechia and received a special prize from the jury.

Career

2006–12: Cinema and television
In 2006, Sarıkaya got her first acting part in a film, Şaşkın, directed by Şahin Alpaslan. In 2008, she starred in a Turkcell commercial and then appeared in her second movie, Plajda, produced by Sinan Çetin and directed by Murat Şeker.

The same year, Sarıkaya obtained her first leading television role in the series Peri Masalı, directed by Celal Çimen, in which she portrayed a fairy godmother. She also appeared in the series Limon Ağacı, also produced by Çetin, and directed by Deniz Ergun. After the tenth episode, Sarıkaya's character was removed from the storyline.

Still in 2008, Sarıkaya began to appear in the TV series Adanalı, which was created by Tayfun Güneyer and directed by Adnan Güler. She played the role of a Greek-Turkish girl and received critical acclaim for her mixed Greek-Adana accent.

Sarıkaya competed in the Miss Turkey beauty contest on 1 April 2010, representing the national capital, Ankara. She placed as the first runner-up to the eventual winner, Gizem Memiç, who represented Gaziantep, and earned the right to represent Turkey in the Miss Universe contest. However, she dropped this chance, as she wanted to continue her acting career, and Memiç took her place instead.

Sarıkaya left the cast of Adanalı in its second season and went on to act in Lale Devri, produced by Şükrü Avşar and directed by Murat Düzgünoğlu. In one episode of the series, she sang a song that attracted audience attention and for which she received offers to record an album. In an interview, she stated: "The offers are correct. Fees aren't bad. But I'm not going to sing. My job is acting".

In 2011, Sarıkaya starred in the short film Hoşçakal. In 2012, she left Lale Devri, at the beginning of the third season.

2013–present: Behzat Ç. Ankara Yanıyor, Medcezir, and other projects
In May 2013, Sarıkaya began filming Behzat Ç. Ankara Yanıyor, a movie adapted from the television series Behzat Ç. Bir Ankara Polisiyesi. In the same year, she appeared alongside Çağatay Ulusoy in the series Medcezir, which is based on the American show The O.C.. The screenplay was written by Ece Yörenç, and the series was directed by Ali Bilgin. Sarıkaya's character, Mira Beylice, was an adaptation of one of the original series' characters, Marissa Cooper. In 2014, she appeared in a Elidor commercial, alongside her Medcezir co-star Hazar Ergüçlü. She later became the face of Mavi Jeans after signing a two-year contract. For the promotion of their spring–summer collection, Sarıkaya shot commercials alongside Brazilian model Francisco Lachowski. Sarıkaya filmed another ad in 2016 for Mavi, with Barbara Palvin. For the 2015 spring–summer collection, Sarıkaya appeared in front of the camera with Kerem Bürsin, and their singing received a positive response from audiences.

In 2017–18, Sarıkaya starred in the show Fi, which is based on a series of novels by Azra Kohen. Fi was one of the first major Turkish television productions to be streamed online by puhutv.

From 2017 to 2018, she was the brand ambassador for Head & Shoulders, filming various campaigns and awareness projects.

In 2019, she made her theatrical debut as Alice with the musical Alice Müzikali, an adaptation of Lewis Carroll's Alice's Adventures in Wonderland. The show was first staged in February 2019 and returned for a second season in September 2019. After a break due to the COVID-19 pandemic, Alice once again returned to the stage on 7 February 2022.

Sarıkaya was cast to film the biograpic Bergen, detailing the life of singer Belgin Sarılmışer. However, due to difficulties caused by the pandemic and other factors, she left the project. In 2021, she became the first-ever Turkish brand ambassador for Bulgari.

Filmography

Theatre

Awards

References

External links
 

1992 births
Living people
Actresses from Ankara
Turkish film actresses
Turkish television actresses
21st-century Turkish actresses
Golden Butterfly Award winners